Amrita is a Hindu movement named after Mata Amritanandamayi.

Founder
Mata Amritanandamayi is often described as the hugging saint. She has hugged countless people. A hug from her is said to have brought peace to the devotees. Ammachi, as she is popularly called, advocates the Advaitic principle of seeing everybody as oneself.

Year & place of founding
Amritapuri, Kollam, Kerala, India.

Monastic / Non-monastic
Monastic

General philosophical outlook
Advaita philosophy is followed. The movement is non-sectarian.

Spiritual disciplines generally advocated
Integrated Amrita Meditation Technique. Service of fellow human-beings.

Administrative set-up

Provision for joining

Present chief of the movement
Mata Amritanandamayi

Activities

Religion & spirituality
Brahmasthanams are the temples built by Amritanandamayi. Here pooja is offered to reduce the negative effect of planets on devotees.

Social field
 Mother's kitchen for feeding the poor, Building the houses for poor, Orphanages, monthly pension scheme for old age people, Old care homes, legal assistance to poor and needy are some of the services described on the organization's website.
 Amrita Institute of Medical sciences is a medical college with facility for 800 beds. Medical treatment is rendered to the poor at free or at subsidised price.
 Amrita Kripasagar is a hospice for terminally ill people with accommodation facility for up to 50 people.
 Amritakripa hospital at Amritapuri for the poor and needy
 Several Mobile centres for giving medical assistance.

Education field
 Amrita School of Engineering
 Amrita School of Business
 Amrita Institute of Medical Sciences
 Schools for software training, Industrial training, Pharmaceutical etc.
 Several primary and secondary education institutes throughout India

Cultural field

Relief activities
 Rendered service during the Gujarat earthquakes
 Tsunami disaster relief operation
Relief Services provided after Bihar floods in Bihar, India.
Haiti Relief in 2010 Haiti Earthquake

Province of its influence
Chiefly Keralan and Malayali communities all over the globe. But has devotees and admirers throughout India.

Major publications
 Amma - Healing the Heart of the World
 Awaken Children - Vol 1 to 9
 Racing along the Razor's edge
 Lead us to light - compiled by Swami Jnanamritananda Puri
 From Amma's heart
 Amrita e-newsletter

See also
 Survey of Hindu organisations

External links
 Mata Amritanandamayi Official Site
 Ammachi

Hindu movements